The ochre-browed thistletail (Asthenes coryi) is a species of bird in the family Furnariidae. It is endemic to western Venezuela.

Its natural habitat is subtropical or tropical high-altitude grassland.

References

ochre-browed thistletail
Birds of the Venezuelan Andes
Endemic birds of Venezuela
ochre-browed thistletail
Taxa named by Hans von Berlepsch
Taxonomy articles created by Polbot